This is a list of places in the continent of South America which have standing links to local communities in other countries, known as "town twinning" (usually in Europe) or "sister cities" (usually in the rest of the world).

Argentina

Bolivia
El Alto
 Medellín, Colombia

Cochabamba

 Arequipa, Peru
 Bergamo, Italy
 Córdoba, Argentina
 Kunming, China
 Montevideo, Uruguay

Coroico
 Montevideo, Uruguay

Oruro
 Lima, Peru

Papel Pampa
 Leganés, Spain

La Paz

 Asunción, Paraguay
 Bogotá, Colombia
 Bonn, Germany
 Canelones, Uruguay
 Havana, Cuba
 Libertador (Caracas), Venezuela
 Montevideo, Uruguay
 Moscow, Russia
 Quito, Ecuador
 Rio de Janeiro, Brazil
 São Paulo, Brazil
 Taipei, Taiwan
 Zaragoza, Spain

Potosí
 Cusco, Peru

Sacaba
 Victoria de Durango, Mexico

Samaipata
 Saalfeld, Germany

Santa Cruz de la Sierra

 Asunción, Paraguay
 Córdoba, Argentina
 Curitiba, Brazil
 Medellín, Colombia
 La Plata, Argentina
 Rosario, Argentina
 San Miguel de Tucumán, Argentina
 Santa Cruz de Tenerife, Spain
 Taichung, Taiwan
 Tainan, Taiwan

Sicaya
 Norrtälje, Sweden

Sucre

 La Plata, Argentina
 San Miguel de Tucumán, Argentina

Tarija

 Asunción, Paraguay
 Brasschaat, Belgium
 Iniesta, Spain
 San Bernardino, Paraguay
 San José de Metán, Argentina
 Tournai, Belgium
 Villa Carlos Paz, Argentina

Uriondo
 Mendoza, Argentina

Brazil

Chile

Colombia
Agustín Codazzi
 Lugo, Italy

Armenia

 Doral, United States
 Medellín, Colombia

Barranquilla

 Bethlehem, Palestine
 Brownsville, United States
 Doral, United States
 Kaohsiung, Taiwan
 Miami, United States
 Nanjing, China
 Panama City, Panama
 Rio de Janeiro, Brazil
 Tampa, United States
 Tula, Russia

Bello
 San Nicolás de los Garza, Mexico

Bogotá

 Buenos Aires, Argentina
 Cádiz, Spain
 Chicago, United States
 León, Mexico
 Lima, Peru
 London, England, United Kingdom
 Madrid, Spain
 La Paz, Bolivia
 Quito, Ecuador
 Santa Fe, Spain
 Seoul, South Korea

Bucaramanga
 Ribeirão Preto, Brazil

Buga
 Guadalajara, Spain

Cali

 Honolulu, United States
 Montevideo, Uruguay

Cartagena

 Acapulco, Mexico
 Angra do Heroísmo, Portugal
 Cachoeira, Brazil
 Cádiz, Spain
 Campeche, Mexico
 Constanța, Romania
 Coral Gables, United States
 Puebla, Mexico
 San Juan, Puerto Rico
 Seville, Spain
 St. Augustine, United States

Chiquinquirá
 Mérida, Mexico

Guachené
 Prairie View, United States

Ibagué

 Chengdu, China
 Vitoria-Gasteiz, Spain

Itagüí
 Saltillo, Mexico

Manizales

 Benidorm, Spain
 Cork, Ireland
 Miami, United States
 Rosario, Argentina
 San Luis Potosí, Mexico
 Soyapango, El Salvador

Manta
 Prairie View, United States

Manzanares
 Mérida, Mexico

Medellín

 El Alto, Bolivia
 Armenia, Colombia
 Asunción, Paraguay
 Avellaneda, Argentina
 Benito Juárez, Mexico
 Bilbao, Spain
 Chapecó, Brazil
 Concepción, Chile
 Fort Lauderdale, United States
 Monterrey, Mexico
 Orange County, United States
 Panama City, Panama
 Puerto Morelos, Mexico
 Quito, Ecuador
 Rosario, Argentina
 San Pedro Sula, Honduras
 Santa Cruz de la Sierra, Bolivia
 Santo Domingo de los Colorados, Ecuador
 Tacuarembó, Uruguay
 Valparaíso, Chile

Pamplona
 Pamplona, Spain

Pasto
 Cuenca, Ecuador

Pereira
 Miami-Dade County, United States

Popayán

 Caltanissetta, Italy
 Cuenca, Ecuador
 Málaga, Spain

San José de Cúcuta
 Leganés, Spain

Santa Fe de Antioquia
 Trujillo, Spain

Tuluá
 Ate, Peru

Tumaco
 Montevideo, Uruguay

Ecuador
Ambato

 Santa Fe, Spain
 Wenzhou, China
 Xalapa, Mexico

Cuenca

 Bandung, Indonesia
 Belo Horizonte, Brazil
 Braga, Portugal
 Cajamarca, Peru
 El Carmen de Viboral, Colombia
 Cienfuegos, Cuba
 Cuenca, Spain
 Cusco, Peru
 Guanajuato, Mexico
 Guarulhos, Brazil
 Huai'an, China
 Newark, United States
 Pasto, Colombia
 Peekskill, United States
 Popayán, Colombia
 Rosario, Argentina
 Salta, Argentina
 San Miguel de Allende, Mexico
 Tempe, United States
 Xi'an, China

Esmeraldas

 Benidorm, Spain
 Montevideo, Uruguay

Guaranda
 Johnson City, United States

Guayaquil

 Houston, United States
 Jesús María, Peru
 Shanghai, China

Loja

 Chiclayo, Peru
 La Huaca, Peru
 Santiago de Surco, Peru
 Vichayal, Peru

Macará
 Leganés, Spain

Manta
 Vladivostok, Russia

Puerto Baquerizo Moreno
 Chapel Hill, United States

Quito

 Bogotá, Colombia
 Cádiz, Spain
 Coral Gables, United States
 Doha, Qatar
 Guangzhou, China
 Guarulhos, Brazil
 Kraków, Poland
 Lima, Peru
 Louisville, United States
 Madrid, Spain
 Managua, Nicaragua
 Medellín, Colombia
 Mexico City, Mexico
 La Paz, Bolivia
 Taipei, Taiwan

Riobamba
 Norwalk, United States

Salinas
 Salisbury, United States

Santo Domingo de los Colorados
 Medellín, Colombia

Tena
 Santa Clarita, United States

Falkland Islands
Stanley

 Airdrie, Scotland, United Kingdom
 Whitby, England, United Kingdom

Guyana
Georgetown

 Fuzhou, China
 Port of Spain, Trinidad and Tobago
 St. Louis, United States

Linden
 Nanchuan (Chongqing), China

Paraguay
Asunción

 Brasília, Brazil
 Buenos Aires, Argentina
 Campinas, Brazil
 Canelones, Uruguay
 Chapecó, Brazil
 Chiba, Japan
 Curitiba, Brazil
 Florianópolis, Brazil
 Florida, Uruguay
 Madrid, Spain
 Medellín, Colombia
 Miami-Dade County, United States
 Montevideo, Uruguay
 La Paz, Bolivia
 La Plata, Argentina
 Quito, Ecuador
 Río Cuarto, Argentina
 Rosario, Argentina
 San José, Costa Rica
 Santa Cruz de la Sierra, Bolivia
 Santo Domingo, Dominican Republic
 São Paulo, Brazil
 São Vicente, Brazil
 Songpa (Seoul), South Korea
 Taipei, Taiwan
 Tarija, Bolivia
 Vitoria-Gasteiz, Spain
 Yerba Buena, Argentina

Fernando de la Mora

 Florianópolis, Brazil
 Pittsburgh, United States
 Santos, Brazil

General Artigas
 Fray Bentos, Uruguay

Hernandarias
 Foz do Iguaçu, Brazil

Presidente Franco

 Acquarossa, Switzerland
 Florianópolis, Brazil
 Puerto Iguazú, Argentina

San Bernardino
 Tarija, Bolivia

San Juan Nepomuceno
 Štěchovice, Czech Republic

Santa María de Fe
 Hays, United States

Villa Hayes
 Fremont, United States

Peru
Arequipa

 Arica, Chile
 Biella, Italy
 Charlotte, United States
 Cochabamba, Bolivia
 Corrientes, Argentina
 Guanajuato, Mexico
 Guangzhou, China
 Iquique, Chile
 Lins, Brazil
 Maui County, United States
 Morelia, Mexico
 Ponta Grossa, Brazil
 Puebla, Mexico
 El Tocuyo, Venezuela

Ate

 Tuluá, Colombia
 Valle de Trápaga-Trapagaran, Spain
 Villa María, Argentina

Callao

 Boryspil, Ukraine
 Comerío, Puerto Rico
 Constanța, Romania
 Mayagüez, Puerto Rico
 Quebradillas, Puerto Rico
 San Germán, Puerto Rico
 Santos, Brazil
 Valparaíso, Chile
 Veracruz, Mexico

Chaclacayo
 Snoqualmie, United States

Chiclayo
 Loja, Ecuador

Chimbote
 Pensacola, United States

Cusco

 Athens, Greece
 Baguio, Philippines
 Bethlehem, Palestine
 Copán Ruinas, Honduras
 Cuenca, Ecuador
 Havana, Cuba
 Jersey City, United States
 Jerusalem, Israel
 Kaesong, North Korea
 Kraków, Poland
 Mexico City, Mexico
 Moscow, Russia
 La Paz, Bolivia
 Potosí, Bolivia
 Puebla, Mexico
 Rio de Janeiro, Brazil
 Samarkand, Uzbekistan
 Tempe, United States

La Huaca
 Loja, Ecuador

Jesús María
 Guayaquil, Ecuador

Lima

 Akhisar, Turkey
 Asunción, Paraguay
 Austin, United States
 Beijing, China
 Bogotá, Colombia
 Bordeaux, France
 Buenos Aires, Argentina
 Cleveland, United States
 Dhaka, Bangladesh
 Guadalajara, Mexico
 Karaçoban, Turkey
 Kyiv, Ukraine

 Madrid, Spain
 Miami, United States
 Oruro, Bolivia
 Pescara, Italy
 Quito, Ecuador
 San Salvador, El Salvador
 Santa Ana, Costa Rica
 São Paulo, Brazil
 Shanghai, China
 Stamford, United States
 Taipei, Taiwan

Miraflores

 Las Condes, Chile
 Pensacola, United States
 Sonsonate, El Salvador
 Viña del Mar, Chile

Pisco

 Cognac, France
 Jerez de la Frontera, Spain
 Rosario, Argentina
 Tequila, Mexico

Piura

 Oklahoma City, United States
 Trujillo, Spain

San Borja
 Ramat Gan, Israel

San Isidro
 Bahía Blanca, Argentina

Santiago de Surco

 Gastonia, United States
 Loja, Ecuador

Tambo de Mora
 Montevideo, Uruguay

Trujillo

 Metepec, Mexico
 Pabillonis, Italy
 Trujillo, Spain

Vichayal
 Loja, Ecuador

Villa El Salvador

 Amstelveen, Netherlands
 Arnhem, Netherlands
 Santa Coloma de Gramenet, Spain
 Tübingen, Germany

Suriname
Marowijne
 Koksijde, Belgium

Paramaribo

 Hangzhou, China
 Miami-Dade County, United States
 Yogyakarta, Indonesia

Uruguay
Atlántida
 Novo Hamburgo, Brazil

Artigas
 Paraná, Argentina

Canelones

 Asunción, Paraguay
 Novo Hamburgo, Brazil
 La Paz, Bolivia

Colonia del Sacramento

 Antigua Guatemala, Guatemala
 Guimarães, Portugal
 Morón, Argentina
 Olinda, Brazil
 Pelotas, Brazil
 Quilmes, Argentina

Dolores
 Dolores, Argentina

Florida

 Asunción, Paraguay
 Gansu Province, China
 Kaifeng, China
 Shenyang, China

Fray Bentos
 General Artigas, Paraguay

Maldonado

 Gramado, Brazil
 Miami-Dade County, United States
 La Plata, Argentina
 Puerto Varas, Chile

Montevideo

 Almirante Brown, Argentina
 Arica, Chile
 Asunción, Paraguay
 Barcelona, Spain
 Bluefields, Nicaragua
 Buenos Aires, Argentina
 Brasília, Brazil
 Cádiz, Spain
 Cali, Colombia
 Cochabamba, Bolivia
 Córdoba, Argentina
 Coroico, Bolivia
 Curitiba, Brazil
 Esmeraldas, Ecuador
 Hurlingham, Argentina
 Havana, Cuba
 Laayoune, Western Sahara
 Libertador (Caracas), Venezuela
 Madrid, Spain
 Mar del Plata, Argentina
 Marsico Nuovo, Italy
 Melilla, Spain
 Montevideo, United States
 La Paz, Bolivia
 La Plata, Argentina
 Port-au-Prince, Haiti
 Rio de Janeiro, Brazil
 Rosario, Argentina
 Santa Cruz de la Sierra, Bolivia
 Santa Fe, Argentina
 Talamanca, Costa Rica
 Tambo de Mora, Peru
 Tito, Italy
 Tumaco, Colombia

Nueva Helvecia
 Subingen, Switzerland

Punta del Este

 Balneário Camboriú, Brazil
 Benito Juárez, Mexico
 Mar del Plata, Argentina
 Marbella, Spain
 Porto Alegre, Brazil

Rosario
 Subingen, Switzerland

Salto
 Salto, Argentina

Tacuarembó
 Medellín, Colombia

Venezuela
Caracas

 Adeje, Spain
 Guadalajara, Mexico
 Honolulu, United States
 Madrid, Spain
 Melilla, Spain
 New Orleans, United States
 Panama City, Panama
 Rosario, Argentina
 Rio de Janeiro, Brazil
 Santa Cruz de Tenerife, Spain
 Santo Domingo, Dominican Republic
 Tehran, Iran
 Vigo, Spain

Caracas – Libertador

 Doha, Qatar
 Montevideo, Uruguay
 La Paz, Bolivia

Colonia Tovar
 Veliko Tarnovo, Bulgaria

Córdoba
 Córdoba, Argentina

Coro
 La Plata, Argentina

Cumaná
 Tepebaşı, Turkey

Maracaibo

 New Orleans, United States
 Ploiești, Romania

Maracay
 Izhevsk, Russia

Mérida
 Mérida, Mexico
 Oaxaca de Juárez, Mexico

El Tocuyo
 Arequipa, Peru

Valencia

 Plovdiv, Bulgaria
 Valencia, Spain

References

South America
South America-related lists